Lake Fork Reservoir is a reservoir located in Wood, Rains, and Hopkins counties in the state of Texas, between the towns of Quitman, Alba, Emory, and Yantis, Texas.

It officially serves as a reservoir for Dallas and its suburbs.  However, it is best known for its fishing, as it holds 15 of the top 20 Texas State Record largemouth bass ever caught, making it one of the premier trophy bass fishing lakes in the world.

Fishing
Lake Fork Reservoir was created as a textbook fishery, including initial stockings before the lake filled. Lake Fork Reservoir was established, by the Texas Parks and Wildlife, as a premier bass fishing lake, with 732,514 Florida-strain largemouth bass being stocked from 1979 through 1987. Lake Fork Reservoir offers excellent fish habitat with 80% standing timber left intact, and hydrilla, milfoil, and duckweed being the predominant vegetation. Other species of fish include catfish, sand bass, yellow bass, black and white crappie, sunfish, bowfin, gar, and bluegill. The predominant food source for the larger fish is shad, minnows, and crawfish.

To preserve the great Lake Fork Reservoir bass fisheries, the Texas Parks and Wildlife implemented a protected slot limit of no bass between  will be kept, and will be returned into the waters of Lake Fork immediately.

Climate

According to the Köppen Climate Classification system, the Lake Fork Reservoir has a humid subtropical climate, abbreviated "Cfa" on climate maps.

References

Resources
source:  Army Corps of Engineers, and USGS

External links
 

Protected areas of Hopkins County, Texas
Protected areas of Rains County, Texas
Fork
Protected areas of Wood County, Texas
United States state-owned dams
Dams in Texas
Dams completed in 1980
Bodies of water of Hopkins County, Texas
Bodies of water of Rains County, Texas
Bodies of water of Wood County, Texas